Cryptolithodes is a genus of king crabs, containing the following species:
Cryptolithodes expansus Miers, 1879
Cryptolithodes sitchensis Brandt, 1853
Cryptolithodes typicus Brandt, 1848

Etymology 
The name "Cryptolithodes" means "hidden stone".

References

King crabs